Jamie Silberhartz is an actress noted for having appeared as Rachel Blake in The Lost Experience, an internet-based alternate-reality-game (ARG) related to the ABC television show, Lost.

She also had a recurring role as Bonnie the receptionist on the CBS television show Without a Trace and has appeared in commercials for Life Savers, Pizza Hut, and Sony.  She has also had one time roles on Ghost Whisperer, Criminal Minds, and Dexter.

External links 
 

Year of birth missing (living people)
Living people
American television actresses
21st-century American women